Katrin Holtwick (born 10 April 1984) is a German retired beach volleyball player. From 2006 to 2016, she played with Ilka Semmler. They competed at the 2012 Summer Olympics in London.

She won 2 gold medals, 5 silver medals and 6 bronze medals in the FIVB Beach Volleyball World Tour.

Professional career

2016 World Tour
At the 2016 Grand Slam in Long Beach, California (Germany vs Germany) the pair finished 4th after a loss to their compatriots Chantal Laboureur/Julia Sude in straight sets (21-16, 21-17).

In September 2016 Holtwick retired after two losses in the German Beach Volleyball Championship.

References

External links
 
 
 

1984 births
Living people
German women's beach volleyball players
Beach volleyball players at the 2012 Summer Olympics
Olympic beach volleyball players of Germany
People from Bocholt, Germany
Sportspeople from Münster (region)